"When You Fall in Love" is a song written by Steve Earle and John Scott Sherrill, and recorded by American country music artist Johnny Lee.  It was released in May 1982 as the third and final single from the album Bet Your Heart on Me. The song reached No. 14 on the Billboard Hot Country Singles & Tracks chart and peaked at No. 46 on the Canadian RPM Country Tracks chart.

Chart performance

References

1982 singles
1981 songs
Johnny Lee (singer) songs
Songs written by John Scott Sherrill
Songs written by Steve Earle
Song recordings produced by Jim Ed Norman
Asylum Records singles